Ruddy Buquet (born 29 January 1977) is a French amateur football referee.

References 

1977 births
French football referees
UEFA Champions League referees
UEFA Europa League referees
Living people
Sportspeople from Amiens